This is a list of notable people from Miramichi, New Brunswick. Although not everyone in this list was born in Miramichi, they all live or have lived there, and have had significant connections to the community.

See also
List of people from New Brunswick

References

Miramichi, New Brunswick
Miramichi